The Indian 10-rupee banknote (10) is a common denomination of the Indian rupee. The 10 note was one of the first notes introduced by the Reserve Bank of India as a part of the Mahatma Gandhi Series in 1996. These notes are presently in circulation along with the Mahatma Gandhi New Series which were introduced in January 2018, this is used alongside the 10 rupee coin.

The 10-rupee banknote has been issued and had been in circulation since colonial times, and in continuous production since Reserve Bank of India took over the functions of the controller of currency in India in 1923.

Mahatma Gandhi New Series

On 5 January 2018, the Reserve Bank of India announced, a new redesigned 10 banknote.

Design
The Reserve Bank of India issued 10 denomination banknotes in the Mahatma Gandhi (New) Series with motif of Sun Temple, Konark on the reverse, depicting the country's cultural heritage. The base colour of the note is Chocolate brown. Dimension of the banknote will be 123 mm × 63 mm.

Security features
The security features seen on the new Mahatma Gandhi series 10 rupee note are:
 See through register with denominational numeral 10
 Denominational numeral १० in Devnagari
 Portrait of Mahatma Gandhi at the centre
 Micro letters "RBI", "भारत", "INDIA" and "10" 
 Windowed demetalised security thread with inscriptions "भारत" and "RBI"
 Ashoka Pillar emblem on the right
 Mahatma Gandhi portrait and electrotype 10 Watermark
 Number panel with numerals growing from small to big on the top left side and bottom right side
 Year of printing of the note on the left

History

George VI Series

The 10 rupee banknote of the George VI Series in 1937, had the portrait of George VI on the obverse and featured two elephants with the banknote denomination written in Urdu, Hindi, Bengali, Burmese, Telugu, Tamil, Kannada and Gujarati on the reverse.

Lion Capital Series

The 10 rupee banknote of the Lion Capital Series in 1970, had the Ashoka pillar and the banknote denomination written in Hindi, Assamese, Bengali, Gujarati, Kannada, Kashmiri, Malayalam, Marathi, Odia, Punjabi, Sanskrit, Tamil, Telugu and Urdu on the obverse, and featured two peacocks and the banknote denomination written in English on the reverse.

Mahatma Gandhi Series

Design

The 10 banknote of the Mahatma Gandhi Series is 137 × 63 mm Orange-violet coloured, with the obverse side featuring a portrait of Mahatma Gandhi with a signature of the governor of Reserve Bank of India. It has the Braille feature to assist the visually challenged in identifying the currency. The reverse side features a motif of a Rhinoceros, an elephant and a tiger, all together as Fauna of India.

As of 2011, the new  sign has been incorporated into banknote of 10. In January 2014 RBI announced that it would be withdrawing from circulation all banknotes printed prior to 2005 by 31 March 2014. The deadline was later extended to 1 January 2015. Now further dead line was extended to 30 June 2016.

As per an announcement made by the Reserve Bank of India (RBI) in March 2017, a new version of the Indian 10 Rupee note will be issued soon, with better security features. The notes will be printed in the Mahatma Gandhi 2005 series. The new note will have an inset letter "L", on both number panels, along with the governor's signature. The year of printing will be on the reverse note side. The numerals printed inside both note panels will be in ascending size, from left side to right side.

Security features

The security features of the 10 banknote includes:

A windowed security thread that reads 'भारत' (Bharat in the Devanagari script) and 'RBI' alternately.
Watermark of Mahatma Gandhi that is a mirror image of the main portrait.
The number panel of the banknote is printed in embedded fluorescent fibers and optically variable ink.
Since 2005 additional security features like machine-readable security thread, electrotype watermark, and year of print appears on the bank note.

Languages

As like the other Indian rupee banknotes, the 10 banknote has its amount written in 17 languages. On the obverse, the denomination is written in English and Hindi. On the reverse is a language panel which displays the denomination of the note in 15 of the 22 official languages of India. The languages are displayed in alphabetical order. Languages included on the panel are Assamese, Bengali, Gujarati, Kannada, Kashmiri, Konkani, Malayalam, Marathi, Nepali, Odia, Punjabi, Sanskrit, Tamil, Telugu and Urdu.

References

Banknotes of India
Rupee
Ten-base-unit banknotes